Indonesia participated in the 1954 Asian Games held in the city of Manila, Philippines from May 1, 1954 to May 9, 1954.

Medal summary

Medal table

Medalists

References

Nations at the 1954 Asian Games
1954
Asian Games